Cerithiopsis iota is a species of sea snail, a gastropod in the family Cerithiopsidae, which is known from the Gulf of Mexico. It was described by C. B. Adams in 1845.

Description 
The maximum recorded shell length is 5 mm.

Habitat 
Minimum recorded depth is 7 m. Maximum recorded depth is 115 m.

References

iota
Gastropods described in 1845